Map of places in Fife compiled from this list

This List of places in Fife is a list of links for any town, village, hamlet, castle, golf course, mansion, hillfort, lighthouse, nature reserve, reservoir, river, and other places of interest in the Fife council area of Scotland.

A
Abercrombie
Aberdour, Aberdour Castle, Aberdour railway station
Anstruther, Anstruther Fish Bar
Arncroach
Auchmuirbridge
Auchterderran
Auchtermuchty
Auchtertool

B
Balbirnie House, Balbirnie Park, Balbirnie Stone Circle
Balcomie Castle
Baldinnie
Balfarg, Balfarg Henge
Balgeddie House
Balgonie Castle
Ballingry
Balmacolm
Balmerino, Balmerino Abbey
Balmullo
Bayview Stadium
Benarty
Blairhall
Blebo Craigs
Bow of Fife
Bowershall
Brownhills
Buckhaven
Burntisland, Burntisland railway station

C
Cairneyhill
Caves of Caiplie
Camdean
Cameron Reservoir
Carden Tower
Cardenden, Cardenden railway station
Carnbee
Carnock
Cellardyke
Central Park
Ceres
Charlestown
Clackmannanshire Bridge
Coaltown of Wemyss
Collessie
Comrie
Cowdenbeath
Craigluscar Hill
Craigrothie
Craigtoun Country Park
Crail, Crail Golfing Society
Crombie
Crossford
Crossgates
Crosshill
Culross, Culross Palace
Cult Hill
Cupar, Cupar railway station 
Cupar Muir

D
Dairsie
Dalgety Bay
Dogton Stone
Dollytown
Donibristle
Dunearn Hill
Dunfermline, Dunfermline Abbey, Dunfermline Palace, Dunfermline Queen Margaret railway station, Dunfermline Town railway station
Dunshalt
Dysart

E
Earlsferry
East End Park
East Neuk
East Wemyss
Eden Estuary
Elie

F
Falkland, Falkland Palace, Falkland Palace Royal Tennis Club
Fife Airport, Fife Circle Line, Fife Coastal Path, Fife Folk Museum Fife Ness
Firth of Forth
Fordell
Forgan
Forth Bridge, Forth Road Bridge
Freuchie

G
Gateside
Gauldry
Glenrothes, Glenrothes with Thornton railway station
Gowkhall
Grange of Lindores
Guardbridge

H
Halbeath
High Valleyfield
Hillend
Hill of Beath

I
Innerleven
Inverkeithing, Battle of Inverkeithing, Inverkeithing railway station
Isle of May

J
Jamestown

K
Kellie Castle
Kelty
Kemback
Kennoway
Kettlebridge
Kilconquhar, Kilconquhar Loch
Kilmany
Kilrenny
Kincardine/Kincardine-on-Forth, Kincardine Bridge, Kincardine power station
Kinghorn, Kinghorn railway station
Kinglassie
Kingsbarns
Kingseat
Kingskettle
Kirkcaldy, Kirkcaldy Museum and Art Gallery, Kirkcaldy railway station
Knockdavie Castle
Knockhill

L
Ladybank
Largo Bay, Largoward
Leslie, Leslie House
Letham
Leuchars, Leuchars railway station, RAF Leuchars
Leven
Levenmouth
Limekilns
Lindores, Lindores Abbey
Lochgelly
Lochore, Lochore Meadows Country Park
Lomond Hills, Lomond Hills Regional Park
Longannet coal mine, Longannet Power Station
Losody
Low Valleyfield
Lower Largo
Lower Methil
Lumphinnans
Lundin Links
Luthrie

M
Macduff's Castle
Markinch, Markinch railway station
Methil, Methilhill
Milton of Balgonie
Morton Lochs
Mountfleurie
Mugdrum Island
Muirhead
Myres Castle

N
Newark Castle
Newburgh, Newburgh railway station
Newburn
Newmills
Newport-on-Tay
Newton of Falkland
Norman's Law
North Queensferry, North Queensferry railway station

O
Oakley
Ochil Hills

P
Pathhead
Pitcairn House
Pitlessie
Pitlour Hill
Pitmilly
Pitreavie Castle, Battle of Pitreavie
Pitscottie
Pittencrieff
Pittenweem, Pittenweem Priory

R
Ravenscraig Castle
River Eden
Rockwood
Rossend Castle
Rosyth, Rosyth Castle, Rosyth Dockyard

S
Saline
Scotstarvit Tower 
Scottish Fisheries Museum
Seafield Tower
Silversands Bay
Springfield, Springfield railway station
St Andrews, Old Course at St Andrews, St Andrews Botanic Garden, University of St Andrews
St Monans
Star
Stark's Park
Steelend
Stratheden
Strathkinness
Strathmiglo
Strathtyrum

T
Tay Rail Bridge, Tay Road Bridge
Tayport
Tentsmuir Forest and Tentsmuir National Nature Reserve
Thornton
Torry Bay
Torryburn
Townhill Country Park
Tulliallan, Tulliallan Castle

U
Upper Largo

W
Wellwood
Wemyss Castle
West Wemyss
Windygates
Woodhaven
Wormit

See also
List of places in Scotland

Fife
Geography of Fife
Lists of places in Scotland
Populated places in Scotland